"Skin Trade" is the second single from Duran Duran's Notorious album, and the band's 15th single in total.  It was released in January 1987, reached #22 on the UK Singles Chart, and #39 on the Billboard Hot 100.

About the song

The music for "Skin Trade" was written long before Simon Le Bon finally finished the lyrics. The title for the song was derived from the Dylan Thomas book Adventures in the Skin Trade which John Taylor had on him during recording of the album. It was shortened to "Skin Trade" and Le Bon eventually wrote the melody and lyrics for the track while spending an evening in Taylor's Upper West Side Manhattan apartment. The lyrics reflect on how everyone is selling themselves, and "there's a little hooker in each of us".

The single was a departure for the band. Simon Le Bon sang in  falsetto, Le Bon admits he was channeling The Rolling Stones lead singer Mick Jagger on their song "Emotional Rescue". A horn section played a prominent role in the track, as played by The Borneo Horns. The band persevered with the single and many aspects of their future business took inspiration from "Skin Trade".  They called their publishing company Skin Trade Music Ltd. and the Notorious tour was called the "Strange Behaviour Tour" (a reference to that line of the song).  Likewise, a 1987 remix EP and a 1999 double CD collection of remixes were also called Strange Behaviour.

Andy Taylor was no longer an official member of Duran Duran by that time, but he was credited as a session guitarist on this song, although apparently he did not participate in the recordings. Meanwhile the new guest musicians, Steve Ferrone and Warren Cuccurullo, played the drums and lead guitars respectively. Nile Rodgers played some lines of the rhythm guitar.

Reception
In a contemporary review, Cash Box praised Le Bon's "Prince-like vocal" and Nile Rodgers' production.
 
In a retrospective review of the single, AllMusic journalist Donald A. Guarisco praised the song. He wrote: "The music lends contrast to the angry tone of the lyrics by creating a sultry, mellow melody that juxtaposes verses with a soft, hypnotic ebb and flow with an ever-ascending chorus that revs up the song's inherent drama."

Music video
The "Skin Trade" video was the second filmed for the band by directors Peter Kagan and Paula Greif, after "Notorious".  Film of band members performing was treated with a rotoscope-like effect, adding vivid colors to details like a person's eyes or jewelry.  Like so many other Duran Duran videos, "Skin Trade" included a beautiful woman - in this case German supermodel Tatjana Patitz.  Her image was rotoscoped for some scenes as well, and her dancing figure was superimposed on several different vividly colored abstract backgrounds.

Session drummer Steve Ferrone and guitarist Warren Cuccurullo, who would later become a full member of the band, appeared in the video, although their faces are not often seen. Cuccurullo also contributed the power chords and harmony parts on the bridges of the album track, with session guitarist Nile Rodgers playing the others.

"Skin Trade" was nominated for Best Special Effects in a Video and Best Cinematography in a Video at the 1987 MTV Video Music Awards, but lost to Peter Gabriel's "Sledgehammer" and Robbie Nevil's "C'est La Vie", respectively.

B-sides and remixes
The b-side to "Skin Trade" was the only original b-side released during the Notorious era. Entitled "We Need You", it was written and recorded in 1986 while the band awaited the return of Andy Taylor for a recording session. It was the first recording to feature just the three remaining members of Duran Duran - Nick Rhodes, John Taylor and Simon Le Bon.

Two further mixes of "Skin Trade" (S.O.S. Dub & Parisian Mix) were completed, but not released commercially during the "Skin Trade" release cycle. They appeared on a US 12" promo and on a UK 12" promo, backed with remixes of the next single "Meet El Presidente". The "Parisian Mix" was also released on the promo-only Master Mixes EP.

The "Parisian Mix" was finally released commercially in the UK and in the U.S. on the "All She Wants Is" (1988) 3" CD single.

There are 4 official mixes of "Skin Trade" 

Skin Trade (7"/Radio Cut) - 4:29
Skin Trade (Stretch Mix) - 7:45
Skin Trade (S.O.S. Dub) - 7:16
Skin Trade (Parisian Mix) - 8:10

Format and track listing

7": EMI. / TRADE 1 United Kingdom
 "Skin Trade" (Radio Cut) - (4:26)
 "We Need You" - (2:49)

12": EMI. / 12 TRADE 1 United Kingdom
 "Skin Trade" (Stretch Mix) - (7:36)
 "Skin Trade" (Album Version) - (5:58)
 "We Need You" - (2:49)
"Stretch Mix" was remixed by famed producer Larry Levan
These tracks were also released on cassette (TC TRADE 1) in a video style box with the banned bum cover.

7": Capitol Records. / B-5670 United States 
 "Skin Trade" (Radio Cut) - (4:26)
 "We Need You" - (2:49)

12": Capitol Records. / V-15274 United States 
 "Skin Trade" (Stretch Mix) - (7:36)
 "Skin Trade" (Album Version) - (5:58)
 "We Need You" - (2:49)

CD: Part of "Singles Box Set 1986-1995" boxset
 "Skin Trade (Radio cut)" (4:25)
 "We Need You" (2:49)
 "Skin Trade" (Stretch mix) (7:36)
 "Skin Trade" (Album version) (5:58)

Chart positions
"Skin Trade" was the first chart disappointment in the band's career.  Not only did it fail to repeat the huge success of "Notorious" but it failed to get the top 20 on either side of the Atlantic, and that was a first for the band since their very earliest releases.  "Skin Trade" later grew to become a fan favourite, but the change of style and direction were shocking at the time.

 #22 UK Singles Chart (7 March 1987)
 #39 Billboard Hot 100 (14 March 1987)
 #3  Italy

Other appearances
Apart from the single, "Skin Trade" has also appeared on:

Albums:
Notorious (1986)
Master Mixes (1987)
Decade (1989)
Now That's What I Call Music!, 1987 - 10th Anniversary Series (1999)
Greatest (1998)
Strange Behaviour (1999)
Singles Box Set 1986-1995 (2004)

Singles:
All She Wants Is (1989)
Ordinary World (1993)
Come Undone (1993)

Personnel
Duran Duran are:
Simon Le Bon – vocals
John Taylor – bass
Nick Rhodes – keyboards

With:
Warren Cuccurullo – guitars (bridge sections)
Nile Rodgers – guitars
Steve Ferrone – drums
The Borneo Horns – horns
Curtis King – background vocals
Brenda White-King – background vocals
Tessa Niles – background vocals
Cindy Mizelle – background vocals

Production:
Nile Rodgers – producer
Duran Duran – producer
Daniel Abraham – remixer, engineer and mixer
Larry Levan – remixer

Charts

Weekly charts

Year-end charts

References

External links
 TM's Duran Duran Discography

1987 singles
Duran Duran songs
Song recordings produced by Nile Rodgers
Songs written by Simon Le Bon
Songs written by John Taylor (bass guitarist)
Songs written by Nick Rhodes